Hickory Neck Church is a historic Episcopal church located near Toano, James City County, Virginia. The original section was built between 1733 and 1738, with an extension made to the main body of the church in 1773–1774. It was altered about 1825. It is a one-story, three bay deep, rectangular brick structure, measuring 36 feet, 6 inches, long by 28 feet, 6 inches, wide.

It was listed on the National Register of Historic Places in 1973.

References

External links
 Hickory Neck Church website
 Hickory Neck Church, U.S. Route 60, Toano, James City County, VA: 2 photos at Historic American Buildings Survey

Historic American Buildings Survey in Virginia
Churches on the National Register of Historic Places in Virginia
Episcopal churches in Virginia
Churches completed in 1738
Churches in James City County, Virginia
National Register of Historic Places in James City County, Virginia
18th-century Episcopal church buildings